Eugen Mladin (born 22 June 1921) was a Romanian footballer and manager.

References

Romanian footballers
Romanian football managers
FC Steaua București players
FC Steaua București managers
FC Universitatea Cluj managers
FC Politehnica Timișoara managers
FC UTA Arad managers
FC Argeș Pitești managers
FCV Farul Constanța managers
1921 births
Year of death missing
CSM Jiul Petroșani managers
Association footballers not categorized by position